The 1827 State of the Union Address was written by John Quincy Adams, the sixth president of the United States.  It was given on Tuesday, December 4, 1827, to the United States House of Representatives and United States Senate.  Adams said, "A revolution of the seasons has nearly been completed since the representatives of the people and States of this Union were last assembled at this place to deliberate and to act upon the common important interests of their constituents."  It was given to the 20th United States Congress.

References

1827 documents
State of the Union
State of the Union Address
State of the Union Address
State of the Union Address
December 1827 events
State of the Union addresses
Presidency of John Quincy Adams
Works by John Quincy Adams
20th United States Congress